Megachile natansiella is a species of bee in the family Megachilidae. It was described by Theodore Dru Alison Cockerell in 1944.

References

Natansiella
Insects described in 1944